Eastbourne by-election may refer to:

 1925 Eastbourne by-election (Sir George Ambrose Lloyd elevated to the peerage)
 1932 Eastbourne by-election (death of Edward Marjoribanks)
 1935 Eastbourne by-election (death of John Slater)
 1990 Eastbourne by-election (assassination of Ian Gow)